Sun Optics Co., Ltd is a Chinese precision optics and lasers manufacturer in Changchun, China. It was founded in 1978 and now mostly produces custom products for a broad variety of companies, including researchers and contractors for the Ministry of National Defense of the People's Republic of China.

References

Manufacturing companies of China
Manufacturing companies established in 1978